Joyce Davenport (born February 23, 1942) is an American sportswoman who played squash and tennis.

Davenport grew up in Philadelphia and earned nine varsity letters while competing in a variety of sports at Lower Merion High School. As a tennis player she made regular appearances at the U.S. Championships during the 1960s and featured in the doubles main draw of the 1969 Wimbledon Championships. She was a two-time national singles champion in squash (1965 & 1969) and is a member of the  U.S. Squash Hall of Fame.

References

External links
 
 

1942 births
Living people
American female tennis players
American female squash players
Sportspeople from Philadelphia
Tennis people from Pennsylvania
20th-century American women